The Iowa Wolves are an American professional basketball team in the NBA G League based in Des Moines, Iowa, and are affiliated with the Minnesota Timberwolves. The Wolves play their home games at the Wells Fargo Arena and compete in the Western Conference of the NBA G League. From 2007 to 2017, the team was known as the Iowa Energy in the NBA Development League (D-League) until being purchased and renamed by the Timberwolves. They broke the D-league attendance record on their first home game with 8,842 fans. They later set the record again in game two of the 2011 D-League Finals with an attendance of 14,036 fans. They won the 2011 D-League Finals, defeating the Rio Grande Valley Vipers two-games-to-one.

History

Formation
On February 27, 2007, the D-League awarded an expansion team to Des Moines, Iowa, as one of the four expansion teams for the 2007–08 season. The team was owned and operated by Iowa Basketball, LLC, a local ownership group led by attorney Jerry Crawford and also including Gary Kirke, Sheldon Ohringer, Paul Drey, Michael Richards and Bruce Rastetter. The team would play their home games at the Wells Fargo Arena, parts of the Iowa Events Center. The team later hired former Northern Iowa player Nick Nurse as the team's first head coach.

The team initially held a naming contest for the team. The choices listed on their website were Corncobs, Maize, River Rats, Scarecrows, and Thoroughbreds. However, on June 29, 2007, the owners announced the name Iowa Energy, along with team colors and logos. The team logo was an orange basketball above the word "energy" and the team colors are purple, orange and red. Two NBA teams, the Chicago Bulls and the Miami Heat, were announced as the team's NBA affiliates.

Iowa Energy (2007–2017)

2007–2010
The Energy began to construct their roster by participating in the 2007 D-League Expansion Draft on September 5, 2007, and the 2007 D-League Draft on November 1, 2007. On November 23, 2007, the Energy played their first game in the D-League. They defeated the defending champion Dakota Wizards 101–99 to record the team's first win. Their inaugural home game at the Wells Fargo Center was played on November 26, 2007. The Energy defeated the Albuquerque Thunderbirds 101–98 in front of a league-record attendance of 8,842. The Energy finished the season third in the Central Division with 22 wins and 28 losses. The record was only the tenth best record in the league and therefore the Energy failed to qualify for the playoffs.

Before the 2008–09 season, the league announced that the Energy would be affiliated with the Bulls and the Phoenix Suns. The Suns, who was previously affiliated with the Albuquerque Thunderbirds, replaced the Heat, which would be affiliated with the Thunderbirds. The Energy improved their performance and finished the season with the best record in the Central Division with 28 wins and 22 losses. They were seeded third for the playoffs and were paired with the Dakota Wizards in the First Round. However, they were defeated by the Wizards at home with a 109–114 loss.

Energy center Courtney Sims, who averaged 22.8 points and 11.0 rebounds per game, won the D-League Most Valuable Player Award. He also earned multiple call-ups to the NBA, signing a pair of 10-day contracts with the Phoenix Suns and the New York Knicks. Guard Othyus Jeffers, who was selected in the third round of the 2008 D-League Draft by the Energy, was named as the Rookie of the Year Award. Sims was named in the All-NBA D-League First Team while Energy first-round draftee Cartier Martin was named in the All-NBA D-League Third Team. Both Sims and Martin received call-ups to the NBA and were forced to miss the Energy's playoff games.

The Energy were reassigned to the Eastern Conference for the 2009–10 season as the league realigned itself to two conferences. Despite losing former MVP Courtney Sims to overseas, the Energy improved their regular season record. They won the Eastern Conference with 37 wins, which was also the best record in the league. As one of the top three seeds, the Energy had the rights to choose their opponents in the first round of the playoffs. They chose to face the seventh seed Utah Flash of the Western Conference. They lost the first game of the series before they bounced back with two straight wins to advance to the semifinals. In the semifinals, the Energy faced the eighth seed Tulsa 66ers, who eliminated the Sioux Falls Skyforce in the first round. The Energy defeated the 66ers 107–102 in the first game at Tulsa. However, the 66ers won the second game at Des Moines to even the series. In the decisive Game 3, the Energy lost 122–127 at home and were eliminated from the playoffs.

2011 championship season
Courtney Sims, Othyus Jeffers and Curtis Stinson all returned to the Energy roster for the 2010–11 season. The team also retained Nick Nurse as head coach after he briefly accepted a coaching position at Iowa State. The Energy matched their previous season performance by recording 37 wins and clinched the first seed again. The Energy once again had the rights to choose their opponents in the first round of the playoffs. They chose seventh seed Utah Flash, who were defeated by the Energy in the first round of last year's playoffs. The Energy and the Flash each won one road game each before the Energy won the decisive Game 3 at home to advance to the semifinal. In the semifinals, the Energy faced the Tulsa 66ers who eliminated them in last year's playoffs. The Energy recorded two straight wins and won the series 2–0 to advance to the D-League Finals.

The Energy faced the third seed Rio Grande Valley Vipers, who defeated the second seed Reno Bighorns in the semifinals. The Energy, led by Curtis Stinson's triple-double, won the first game 123–106 at Hidalgo. Stinson scored 29 points along with 10 rebounds and 10 assists, while five other Energy players scored in double figures. The Vipers won the second game 141–122 despite Stinson's second straight triple-double. That second game at Wells Fargo Arena was attended by a new league-record attendance of 14,036 fans. In the decisive Game 3, Stinson suffered an injury that limited his playing time. The Energy trailed the Vipers by seven points after three quarters, but managed to outscore the Vipers 38–23 in the fourth quarter to clinch the D-League championship. Guard Stefhon Hannah led the Energy with 31 points, while five other Energy players scored in double figures.

Stinson, who averaged 19.3 points, 9.8 assists and 5.7 rebounds per game, was named as the D-League Most Valuable Player Award. Stinson and former Rookie of the Year Othyus Jeffers were named in the All-NBA D-League Team. Two Energy stars, Jeffers and former MVP Courtney Sims, both missed the Energy's playoff games. Jeffers received a call-up to the Washington Wizards and signed a contract for the remainder of the season, while Sims left the team to play in China.

2011–2014
Before the 2011–12 season, the league announced that the Energy would be affiliated with three teams, the Bulls, the New Orleans Hornets and the Washington Wizards. The Energy ended their three years affiliation with the Suns as the Bakersfield Jam was announced to be the Suns' new affiliate. On July 15, 2011, head coach Nick Nurse left the Energy and was hired by the Rio Grande Valley Vipers to be their new head coach. The Energy later named former Utah Flash head coach Kevin Young as the team's new head coach.

For the 2012–13 season, Energy added the Denver Nuggets as an affiliate in addition to the existing affiliations with the Bulls, Hornets, and Wizards. Young was fired in January 2013, replaced by Bruce Wilson on an interim basis.

The Minnesota Timberwolves were added as an affiliate for the 2013–14 season, while Nate Bjorkgren as the franchise's new head coach. Led by Othyus Jeffers, who was co-Most Valuable Player of the season along with Ron Howard, the Energy won its second Central Division title and fourth Division/Conference title overall, but fell to the Fort Wayne Mad Ants in the playoffs.

2014–2017

Following the 2014 season, the Energy announced that they would be entering a hybrid single affiliation deal with the Memphis Grizzlies. The team's color scheme shifted towards that of the Grizzlies. Jed Kaplan, a minority owner of the Memphis Grizzlies, led the new affiliation deal and was named managing partner for the Energy ownership group. The agreement ended at the conclusion of the 2016–17 season as the Grizzlies began operating their own D-League team, the Memphis Hustle.

Iowa Wolves (2017–present)
On January 23, 2017, it was announced that the Minnesota Timberwolves would be purchasing the Energy to serve as their D-League affiliate beginning with the 2017–18 season and was finalized on May 3, 2017. On May 30, the team announced it had rebranded to the Iowa Wolves. The affiliation between the Timberwolves and the Wolves is the second between the Twin Cities and Des Moines as the Minnesota Wild of the National Hockey League and the Iowa Wild of the American Hockey League also share an affiliation.

Season results

Players

Current roster

Awards and honors

NBA D-League Most Valuable Player Award
Courtney Sims (2009)
Curtis Stinson (2011)
Othyus Jeffers (co-) (2014)

NBA D-League Rookie of the Year Award
Othyus Jeffers (2009)

All-NBA D-League First Team
Cartier Martin (2010)
Courtney Sims (2009)
Curtis Stinson (2010, 2011)
Othyus Jeffers (2014)
Alex Stepheson (2016)

All-NBA D-League Second Team
Othyus Jeffers (2011)

All-NBA D-League Third Team
Earl Barron (2010)
Cartier Martin (2009)
Damien Wilkins (2015)

NBA D-League All-Star Game Most Valuable Player Award
Courtney Sims (2009, 2011)

Players with NBA experience

Joel Anthony (2008)
Earl Barron (2009–2010)
Shannon Brown (2008)
Earl Clark (2010)
Daequan Cook (2008)
JamesOn Curry (2007–2009)
John Edwards (2009)
Patrick Ewing Jr. (2012)
Diante Garrett (2014–2015)
Taylor Griffin (2009–2010)
Xavier Henry (2012)
Othyus Jeffers (2008–2011)
James Johnson (2011)
Dwayne Jones (2009)
Gani Lawal (2010)
Cartier Martin (2008–2010, 2012, 2015)
Hamady N'Diaye (2012)
Demetris Nichols (2007–2009)
Xavier Silas (2011-2012)
Garret Siler (2010–2011)
Cedric Simmons (2008)
Courtney Sims (2008–2011)
Mike Taylor (2011)
Anthony Tolliver (2007–2009)
Jeff Trepagnier (2009–2010)
Alando Tucker (2008–2009)
Darryl Watkins (2008)
Kyle Weaver (2010–2011)
Damien Wilkins (2014–2018)
Jordan Adams (2014–2015)
Jarnell Stokes (2014–2015)
Russ Smith (2015)
James Ennis (2015–present)

NBA call-ups

A call-up occurs when a player is signed by an NBA team. A G League player is usually signed to a 10-day contract, a short-term contract which lasts ten days, and is available to be used starting January 5. A player can only sign two 10-day contracts with the same team in one season. If the team wants to retain the player after the second 10-day contract expires, the team has to sign the player for the remainder of the season.

Note
Number in parentheses indicates the number of call-ups from the Energy/Wolves that a player has received during the season.

NBA assignments
An NBA team can assign rookies or second year players to its affiliated D-League team. A player can be assigned to the Development League only three times in a season.

Note
Number in parentheses indicates the number of assignments to the Energy that a player has received during the season.

Coaches

Jeff Newton

NBA affiliates

Iowa Energy
Chicago Bulls (2007–2014)
Denver Nuggets (2012—2014)
Memphis Grizzlies (2014–2017)
Miami Heat (2007–2008)
Minnesota Timberwolves (2013–2014)
New Orleans Hornets/Pelicans (2011–2014)
Phoenix Suns (2008–2011)
Washington Wizards (2011–2014)

Iowa Wolves
Minnesota Timberwolves (2017–present)

References

External links
 Official website

 
Basketball teams established in 2007
2007 establishments in Iowa
Basketball teams in Iowa
Minnesota Timberwolves